Sir Henry Lesser Rothband, 1st Baronet (died 1 November 1940), was a British public servant.

Rothband was the author of The Rothband employment scheme for sailors and soldiers disabled in the war, published in 1917. He was created a baronet, of Higher Broughton, Salford, in the County Palatine of Lancaster, in 1923, in recognition of his "public services".

Rothband died in November 1940 when the baronetcy became extinct.

References

1940 deaths
Baronets in the Baronetage of the United Kingdom
Year of birth missing
British non-fiction writers
British male writers
Male non-fiction writers